"Delete" is the debut single by Australian rock band DMA's. It was released on 17 February 2014 and is from their self-titled debut extended play. It was also included on the band's debut studio album, Hills End. The song peaked at number 88 in Australia in 2014 and was certified platinum in 2019.

The video for "Delete" received high rotation on Rage and on Triple J and had them being compared to Oasis on social media.

Charts

Certifications

References

2014 debut singles
2014 songs
DMA's songs